The 2022 Gwynedd Council election took place on 5 May 2022 to elect 69 members from 65 wards to Gwynedd Council. On the same day, elections were held to the other 21 local authorities and to community councils in Wales as part of the 2022 Welsh local elections. The previous Gwynedd all-council election took place in May 2017 and future elections will take place every five years.

The election saw the amount of councillors elected to Gwynedd Council reduced, from 75 to 69, as part of boundary changes to the council carried out by the Local Democracy and Boundary Commission for Wales. 28 councillors were elected unopposed, an increase from the 2017 Gwynedd Council election which saw 21 councillors elected unopposed, despite the reduction in the total number of seats.

Election results 
Plaid Cymru held control of the council, increasing their number of councillors to 44. 23 independent councillors were elected (including sitting Llais Gwynedd councillors who used a blank description on the ballot paper) – a collective loss of nine seats. Labour and the Liberal Democrats returned one seat each.

|}

Ward results

Aberdyfi

Abererch

Abermaw

Abersoch gyda Llanengan

Arllechwedd

Arthrog a Llangelynnin

Bethel a'r Felinheli

Bontnewydd

Bowydd and Rhiw

Brithdir and Llanfachreth / Y Ganllwyd / Llanelltyd

Bro Dysynni

Cadnant (Caernarfon)

Canol Bangor

Canol Bethesda

Canol Tref Caernarfon

Clynnog

Corris a Mawddwy

Criccieth

Cwm y Glo

De Dolgellau

De Pwllheli

Deiniolen

Dewi (Bangor)

Diffwys and Maenofferen

Dolbenmaen

Dwyrain Bangor

Dwyrain Porthmadog

Dyffryn Ardudwy

Efailnewydd a Buan

Gerlan

Glaslyn

Glyder (Bangor)

Gogledd Dolgellau

Gogledd Pwllheli

Gorllewin Porthmadog

Gorllewin Tywyn

Harlech a Llanbedr

Hendre

Llanbedrog gyda Mynytho

Llanberis

Llandderfel

Llanllyfni

Llanrug

Llanuwchllyn

Llanwnda

Llanystumdwy

Menai (Caernarfon)

Morfa Nefyn a Thudweiliog

Morfa Tywyn

Nefyn

Peblig (Caernarfon)

Pen draw Llyn

Pen-y-groes

Penisarwaun

Penrhyndeudraeth

Rachub

Teigl

Trawsfynydd

Tregarth a Mynydd Llandygai

Tryfan

Waunfawr

Y Bala

Y Faenol

Y Groeslon

Yr Eifl

By-elections

Llanuwchllyn

Notes

References 

2022
Gwynedd